The Rätschenhorn (also known as Rätschenflue) is a mountain in the Rätikon range of the Alps, overlooking St. Antönien in the canton of Graubünden. It is located west of the Madrisa.

References

External links
 Rätschenhorn on Hikr

Mountains of the Alps
Mountains of Graubünden
Mountains of Switzerland
Luzein